Thirumakaraleeswarar Temple (also called Thirumagaral Temple and Thirumakaral Easwarar Temple) is a Hindu temple dedicated to the deity Shiva, located in Magaral, a village in Kanchipuram district in the South Indian state of Tamil Nadu. Shiva is worshipped as Thirumakaraleeswarar, and is represented by the lingam. His consort Parvati is depicted as Tribuvananayagi. The presiding deity is revered in the 7th century Tamil Saiva canonical work, the Tevaram, written by Tamil saint poets known as the Nayanmars and classified as Paadal Petra Sthalam.

The temple complex covers two acres and it houses a five tier gateway tower known as gopurams, axially facing the Thirumakaraleeswarar shrine. The temple has a number of shrines, with those of Thirumakaraleeswarar and his consort Tribuvananayagi being the most prominent.

The temple has six daily rituals at various times from 6:00 a.m. to 8:30 p.m., and four yearly festivals on its calendar. The Brahmotsavam festival celebrated during Masi (February–March) is the most prominent festival.

The original complex is believed to have been built by Cholas, while the present masonry structure was built during the Vijayanagar Empire Nayak during the 16th century. In modern times, the temple is maintained and administered by the Hindu Religious and Charitable Endowments Department of the Government of Tamil Nadu.

Legend

As per Hindu legend, Indra, the king of celestial deities, presented his white elephant to Muruga, the son of Shiva, during his marriage at Thiruparakundram. The divine couple travelled on the elephant. When Vishnu wanted to view the couple, they appeared at Thirumagaral.

As per another legend, a ruler of the region wanted the fruit from a jack fruit tree in the place wanted it to be offered to Chidambaram Nataraja Temple every day and subsequently to him. He ordered the local public to carry out the activity every day. Once it was a turn of a boy in the village to carry the fruit. He felt that the king has made an undue order and wanted it to be eliminated. He burnt the tree thinking that the villagers would be relieved off the duty. The king enquired the boy, who fearlessly narrated the truth. The king was angry with him and started chasing him to punish. He found a golden iguana cross his way to an anthill. The king dug the anthill only to see blood woozing out. A divine voice told him that it was Shiva who appeared that and the king had to build a temple for his propitiation.

Architecture

This temple is situated in Magaral, a village in Kanchipuram district, located 12 km from Uthiramerur on the Uthiramerur - Kanchipuram highway. The temple is located on the northern banks of Cheyyar River. The nearest railway station is at Kanchipuram and the nearest airport is Chennai International Airport. The main rajagopuram is on the east side with seven tiers and pierces the large rectangular granite walls. The temple tank, Indra Theertha, is located inside the main entrance. The temple is built on an elevated platform and there are two corridors inside the temple. At the main entrance, the sculptures of Ganapathy and Muruga can be found on both the sides. The main shrine accommodates the image of Shiva known as Thirumakaraleeswarar in the form of Lingam, of the size of the tail of an iguana. There is a separate shrine for Balambigai to the right of Thirumakaraleeswarar's sanctum. The first precinct on the four sides of the sanctum sanctorum are decorated with the images of Nayanmars, Navagrahas, Bhairava, Murugan Sannadhi in the northwest and Durga Sannadhi on the northeast. The vimana of the temple is called Gajabrusta in model, replicating the hip of an elephant.

History and religious importance

The original complex is believed to have been built by Cholas, while the Rajagopuram and  masonry structure was built during the Vijayanagar Dynasty Nayakkar Kings  during the 15th century. There are several inscriptions from the period of Kulothunga Chola I (reigned 1070–1120), Sundara Pandiyan and Vicayakanta Kopaletevar, indicating generous gifts to the temple. In modern times, the temple is maintained and administered by the Hindu Religious and Charitable Endowments Department of the Government of Tamil Nadu.

It is one of the shrines of the 275 Paadal Petra Sthalams - Shiva Sthalams glorified in the early medieval Tevaram poems by Tamil Saivite Nayanmars Thirugnana Sambanthar. As the temple is revered in Tevaram, it is classified as Paadal Petra Sthalam, one of the 276 temples that find mention in the Saiva canon. As per Periya Puranam, the hagiography depicting the life of the 63 Nayanmars, Sambandar visited the place before moving on Kuranganilmuttam and Kanchipuram.

Festivals

The temple priests perform the puja (rituals) during festivals and on a daily basis. The temple rituals are performed six times a day; Kalasanthi at 6:00 a.m., Irandam Kalm at 9:00 a.m., Uchikalam at 12:00 a.m., Sayarakshai at 6:00 p.m,  Irandam Kalm at 7:30 p.m., and Arthajamam at 9:00 p.m.. Each ritual comprises four steps: abhisheka (sacred bath), alangaram (decoration), naivethanam (food offering) and deepa aradanai (waving of lamps) for Makaraleeswarar and Tribuvananayagi. Other festivals include Vinayaka Chaturthi, Aadi Pooram, Navaratri, Aippasi Pournami, Skanda Sashti, Kartikai Deepam, Arudra Darisanam, Tai Poosam, Maasi Magam, Panguni Uththiram and Vaikasi Visakam. The major festival of the temple is the Brahmotsavam celebrated during the Tamil month of Masi (February–March), when special worship practises are followed and the festival image of the deity is taken around the streets of Tirumagaral.

References

External links

Hindu temples in Kanchipuram district
Padal Petra Stalam